Bayannur Wulanyiligeng Wind Farm is a wind farm in Urat Middle Banner, Inner Mongolia, China.  The carbon emissions reduced from this wind farm is 894,569 metric tonnes  equivalent per annum. It is one of the largest in the world.

References

Wind farms in China